Matthew Albert Batten (born June 22, 1995) is an American professional baseball infielder for the San Diego Padres of Major League Baseball (MLB). He made his MLB debut in 2022.

Amateur career
Batten attended St. Joseph High School in Trumbull, Connecticut, and played college baseball at Quinnipiac University. During his senior season at Quinnipiac, he set the record for most hits in program history with 249, most stolen bases with 65, and also led the team with a .305 average. After his senior year, he was selected by the San Diego Padres in the 32nd round of the 2017 Major League Baseball draft.

Professional career
Batten signed with the Padres and split his first professional season between the Arizona League Padres and Tri-City Dust Devils, batting .241 with one home run and twenty RBIs over 49 games. In 2018, he played with the Lake Elsinore Storm, San Antonio Missions, and El Paso Chihuahuas with whom he hit .272 with two home runs, 22 RBIs, and 12 stolen bases over 78 games. He returned in 2019 to play two games with the Amarillo Sod Poodles and 109 games with El Paso, finishing the season batting .298 with six home runs, 48 RBIs, and twenty doubles over 111 games. After not playing a game in 2020 due to the cancellation of the minor league season, he split the 2021 season between San Antonio and El Paso and slashed .293/.368/.382 with six home runs, 41 RBIs, and 28 stolen bases over 123 games. He was selected to play in the Arizona Fall League for the Peoria Javelinas after the season. He opened the 2022 season with El Paso.

On June 30, 2022, the Padres selected Batten's contract and promoted him to the major leagues; he made his MLB debut that night as a pinch runner versus the Los Angeles Dodgers.

References

External links

Quinnipiac Bobcats bio

1995 births
Living people
People from Shelton, Connecticut
Baseball players from Connecticut
Major League Baseball infielders
San Diego Padres players
Quinnipiac Bobcats baseball players
Arizona League Padres players
Tri-City Dust Devils players
Lake Elsinore Storm players
San Antonio Missions players
Amarillo Sod Poodles players
El Paso Chihuahuas players
Peoria Javelinas players